The Burlington Bees are a collegiate summer baseball team of the Prospect League. They are located in Burlington, Iowa, and have played their home games at Community Field since 1947. Founded in 1889, the Bees played in Minor League Baseball's Midwest League from 1962 to 2020. With Major League Baseball's reorganization of the minor leagues after the 2020 season, Burlington was not selected to continue in affiliated baseball.

The team was first known as the "Bees" from 1924 to 1932 and again from 1954 to 1981. The Bees nickname was revived for the 1993 season and remains to this day.

Baseball Hall of Fame inductees Billy Williams, Paul Molitor and Larry Walker played for Burlington.

History 
The team began playing in Burlington in 1889 as the Burlington Babies. Teams with various nicknames played until the Burlington Pathfinders were named in 1906, keeping the nickname until 1916 and playing in the Central Association. After a hiatus, the Burlington Bees played in the Mississippi Valley League from 1924 to 1932. The franchise then returned as the Burlington Indians in 1947, the same year that their current stadium, Community Field, opened. They won the league championship in 1949, their third and final year in the Central Association. The team joined the Three-I (Illinois, Iowa, Indiana) League in 1952 as the Burlington Flints but was renamed the Bees in 1954. In 1958, Billy Williams played 61 games with the Bees before joining the Cubs. Burlington joined the Midwest League in 1962 as a farm team of the Pittsburgh Pirates. From 1963 through 1974 they were a farm team of the Kansas City (later Oakland) A's; subsequent affiliations included the Brewers (1975–81), Rangers (1982–85), Expos (1986–87 and 1993–94), Braves (1988–90), Astros (1991–92), Giants (1995–96), Reds (1997–98), and White Sox (1999–2000).

The Bees have won the Midwest League Championship four times, in four different decades: 1965 (won both halves), 1977 (defeated Waterloo Indians), 1999 (defeated Wisconsin Timber Rattlers) and 2008 (defeated South Bend Silver Hawks).

Catcher Herbert Whitney of the Burlington Pathfinders was killed by a pitched ball in 1906. On June 26 in Waterloo, Iowa, Whitney was beaned by a pitch from Fred Evans of the Waterloo Microbes. He suffered a skull fracture and died that day as a result.

The team was first known as the Bees from 1924 to 1932 and again from 1954 to 1981. Starting in 1982, they used the nickname of their major league parent club, before the current Bees nickname was revived for the 1993 season.

In addition to Baseball Hall of Famers Billy Williams, Paul Molitor and Larry Walker,  many former Burlington players have enjoyed major league success including: Sal Bando, Vida Blue (who struck out a team-record 231 batters in 1968), George Hendrick, Phil Garner, Chet Lemon, Claudell Washington, Rubén Sierra, Kenny Rogers, José Vidro, Ugueth Urbina, Javy López, Mark Buehrle, Mike Moustakas, and Salvador Pérez. Over 100 former Bees have played in the majors.

In 2007, the Bees changed their logo and uniforms. Since 2000, the Bees have had three affiliates: the Kansas City Royals (2001–10), Oakland Athletics (2011–12), and the Los Angeles Angels (2013–2020).

Following the 2020 season, the Bees were cut from the Midwest League and affiliated baseball as part of Major League Baseball's reorganization of the minor leagues. They later joined the Prospect League, a collegiate summer baseball league, for 2021.

Ballpark
The Bees have called historic Community Field, nicknamed "the hive", their home since 1947. The original grandstand portion of the stadium was destroyed in a 1971 fire and rebuilt. The stadium was upgraded again prior to the 2004 season, including a revamped concessions area, partial covering of the grandstand, improved sound system, and a new scoreboard. Named the 2013 "Field of the Year" in the state of Iowa by the Iowa Sports Turf Management Association, capital improvements are supported by The Friends of Community Field, a 501(c)(3) non-profit organization.

No-hitters
Several Burlington pitchers have thrown no-hitters:

 6-4-1962	Pedro Tio,	      Quad Cities	13–0	7 innings
 8-14-1962	Charles Ling,	         Keokuk	        6–0	
 5-6-1965	Don Pierce,	      Fox Cities	4–0	
 6-29-1965	George Bosworth,	Cedar Rapids	3–0
 6-19-1968	Vida Blue,         Appleton	4–0	7 Innings
 7-20-1975	Abelino Pena	    Cedar Rapids	2–0	7 Innings Perfect Game	
 8-5-1996	Jason Grote	        Clinton	        8–0
 5-6-1998	Lance Davis/Dan Timm	Quad City	5–0
 8-5-2003 Jonah Bayliss	         Peoria	        1–0
 4-12-2004	Dusty Hughes/Jake Mullis Wisconsin	3–0
 6-30-2004	Chris Coughlin	         Beloit	        3–0	Perfect game
 8-7-2008	Danny Duffy/Juan Abreu   Peoria	10–0

Roster

Notable alumni

Baseball Hall of Fame alumni
 Larry Walker (1986) Inducted, 2020
 Paul Molitor (1977) Inducted, 2004
 Billy Williams (1958) Inducted, 1987

Notable alumni

 Jared Walsh (2016) MLB All-Star
 Max Muncy (2012) MLB All-Star
 Addison Russell (2012) MLB All-Star
 Zack Thornton (2011)
 Salvador Pérez (2009) 3 x GG; 3 X MLB All-Star
 Eric Hosmer (2009)
 Mike Moustakas (2008) MLB All-Star
 Mark Buehrle (1999) 4 x GG; 5 x MLB All-Star
 Shawn Estes (1995)  MLB All-Star
 Jose Vidro (1993) 3 x MLB All-Star
 Ugueth Urbina (1993)  2 x MLB All-Star: 1999 NL Saves Leader
 Carlos Perez (1993) MLB All-Star
 Javy López (1990) 3 x MLB All-Star
 Mike Mordecai (1989)
 Mike Stanton (1988) MLB All-Star
 Kent Bottenfield (1987) MLB All-Star
 Mel Rojas (1987) MLB All-Star
 Chad Kreuter (1985)
 Mike Stanley (1985) MLB All-Star
 Kenny Rogers (1984) 5 x GG; 4 x MLB All-Star
 Rubén Sierra (1984) 4 x MLB All-Star; 1989 AL RBI Leader
 Randy Ready (1981)
 Bob McClure (1981)
 Doug Jones (1979) 5 x MLB All-Star
 Moose Haas (1975)
 Dwayne Murphy (1974)
 Matt Keough (1974)  MLB All-Star 
 Wayne Gross (1973–74) MLB All-Star
 Chet Lemon (1973–74) 3 x MLB All-Star
 Mike Norris (1973) 2 x GG; MLB All-Star
 Claudell Washington (1973) 3 x MLB All-Star
 Dan Ford (1971–72)
 Phil Garner (1971) 3 x MLB All-Star
 Glenn Abbott (1971)
 George Hendrick (1968, 1970) 4 x MLB All-Star
 Vida Blue (1968) 6 x MLB All-Star; 1971 AL Cy Young Award; 1971 AL Most Valuable Player
 Sal Bando (1965) 4 x MLB All-Star
 Gene Alley (1960) 2 x GG; 2 x MLB All-Star
 Jim Brewer (1958) MLB All-Star
 George Altman (1957)
 Dave Stenhouse (1956) MLB All-Star
 Johnny Vander Meer (1953 Player/MGR) 
 Lloyd Brown (1949)
 Hal Trosky (1932) 1936 AL RBI Leader (162)

Players (1947–present)
 Burlington Indians (1947–49)
 Burlington Flints (1952–53)
 Burlington Bees (1954–81)
 Burlington Rangers (1982–85)
 Burlington Expos (1986–87)
 Burlington Braves (1988–90)
 Burlington Astros (1991–92)
 Burlington Bees (1993–present)

References

Sources 
 Dinda, J. (2003), "Burlington, Iowa, in the Midwest League," Burlington, Iowa in the Midwest League | MWLguide.com

External links 
 

Baseball teams established in 1924
Prospect League teams
Defunct Midwest League teams
Burlington, Iowa
Professional baseball teams in Iowa
Los Angeles Angels minor league affiliates
Los Angeles Angels of Anaheim minor league affiliates
Oakland Athletics minor league affiliates
Kansas City Royals minor league affiliates
Kansas City Athletics minor league affiliates
Chicago White Sox minor league affiliates
Cincinnati Reds minor league affiliates
Atlanta Braves minor league affiliates
San Francisco Giants minor league affiliates
Montreal Expos minor league affiliates
Houston Astros minor league affiliates
Pittsburgh Pirates minor league affiliates
Chicago Cubs minor league affiliates
Cleveland Guardians minor league affiliates
Central Association
Fan-owned baseball teams
Illinois-Indiana-Iowa League teams
1924 establishments in Iowa
Central Association teams
Amateur baseball teams in Iowa
Mississippi Valley League teams